Malthonea cuprascens is a species of beetle in the family Cerambycidae. It was described by Waterhouse in 1880. It has been known to inhabit Ecuador and Peru.

References

Desmiphorini
Beetles described in 1880